HD 4313 is a K-type subgiant located in the constellation of Pisces. It hosts an extrasolar planet, and is drifting away from the Solar System with a radial velocity of 14.67 km/s.

HD 4313 is a single star, which means it has no binary partners, at least in range of projected separations from  6.85 to 191.78 AU.

Physical properties 
This is an aging star with a mass of nearly twice the Sun, although different methods give mass estimates which differ as much as 0.5 . It also is a swollen star with 5.14 times the radius, and has a cool temperature of 4966 k. The "IV" in the spectral class means it's a K-type subgiant star which is starting to exhaust the hydrogen at its core, and cooling and expanding to become a red giant.

Planetary system
HD 4313 has a superjovian planet orbiting it. This planet was discovered in 2010.

References 

K-type subgiants
Pisces (constellation)
003574
BD+07 104
J00454035+0750421
004313
Planetary systems with one confirmed planet